HMS Winchelsea (D46) was an Admiralty W-class destroyer of the Royal Navy, ordered 9 December 1916 from J. Samuel White at Cowes during the 1916–17 Build Programme.

Winchelsea was launched on 15 December 1917 and was the 7th Royal Navy ship to carry this name, introduced in 1694 and named after the 6th Earl of Winchilsea (1647–1730)

In March 1945 she was decommissioned and sold for scrap.

Events in history
September 1939 — with the 11th Destroyer Flotilla.

26 May–4 June 1940 — the Dunkirk evacuation, code-named Operation Dynamo.
 
27 July 1940 — 84 survivors from the British freighters Sambre and Thiara were picked up.

13-17 September 1940 — Escorts Convoy OB 213.  After Winchelsea leaves, two ships in the convoy, including the child evacuation ship SS City of Benares, were attacked by a submarine. 260 people, including 258 passengers and crew from the Benares, are killed.

17 September 1940 — 25 survivors from the British freighter Crown Arun were picked up after the ship had been torpedoed and then sunk with gunfire by the German submarine , north of Rockall.

See also
Winchelsea

Notes

Bibliography

 
 
 
 

 
 
 
 
 
 

V and W-class destroyers of the Royal Navy
1917 ships